Tol-e Gavmishi (also Romanized as Tol-e Gāvmīshī; also known as Bāqerābād, Gāvmīsh, and Tal-e Gāvmīsh) is a village in Hamaijan Rural District, Hamaijan District, Sepidan County, Fars Province, Iran. At the 2006 census, its population was 94, in 20 families.

References 

Populated places in Sepidan County